Josh Perkins (born August 25, 1995) is an American professional basketball player for Petkim Spor of the Basketbol Süper Ligi (BSL). He played college basketball for the Gonzaga Bulldogs.

High school career

Perkins began his high school career at Regis Jesuit High School in Aurora, Colorado. As a freshman, he helped lead his school to winning the Colorado 5A State Championship, coming off the bench to score 12 points in the title game. 

As a sophomore, Perkins averaged 18.6 points, 5.2 assists, 4 rebounds, 2 steals, and a 1.51 assist-to-turnover ratio while shooting 56.1 percent from 2-point range, 34 percent from beyond the 3-point arc, and 81.8 percent from free throws.

In his junior year, Perkins averaged 25.2 points, 6.9 rebounds, 6.5 assists, 1.7 steals, and a 1.27 assist-to-turnover ratio while shooting 56.1 percent from 2-pointers, 29.2 percent on 3-point field goals, and 73.7 percent from the charity stripe. He led Colorado 5A in scoring and led Regis Jesuit to a 21-5 record, including 10-1 in the Continental League and a trip to the Colorado 5A State Semifinals. The Aurora Sentinel named Perkins Co-Player of the Year, and he also earned 5A All-State honors. MaxPreps named him an honorable mention to their Junior All-American team.

In the summer before his senior year, Perkins made a major decision to transfer from Regis Jesuit to prestigious high school basketball powerhouse, Huntington Prep in West Virginia. He wanted to be able to compete against strong competition on a regular basis and prepare himself for the college game before he would enroll in college a year later.

Recruiting

In late June 2013, Perkins claimed he was being recruited the hardest by Gonzaga, UCLA, USC, Kansas, Kentucky, Syracuse, Connecticut, Baylor, and Minnesota. He said he had no favorites at the time, that he wanted to cut his list to 7-9 schools soon, and that he wanted a school with superior education, with coaches who will have his back and push him to bring out his best potential. In late July 2013, he cut his list to 5 schools (UCLA, Minnesota, Gonzaga, Uconn, and Kentucky). After naming his final 3 as UCLA, Gonzaga, and Minnesota a couple days before his decision, Josh Perkins commit to Gonzaga on August 24, 2013. Perkins signed with Gonzaga during the early signing period in November 2013.

College career
Josh Perkins' true freshman year was cut to only the first 5 games of the season, but he still averaged 5 points, 3.4 assists, 1 rebound, 0.8 steals, and a 1.7 assist-to-turnover ratio on 62.5 percent from 2-point range, 40 percent from beyond the 3-point line, and 75 percent from free throws in 20.2 minutes per game. He was a valuable player in practice and helped Gonzaga reach the Elite Eight for the first time since 1999, as well as a 2 seed in the NCAA Tournament and a 35-3 record (17-1 in the WCC).

In his first collegiate game, Josh Perkins scored 8 points, while adding 6 assists, 1 rebound, and 1 steal, on 2-of-3 from 3-point range and 2-of-2 free throws in a win over Sacramento State on November 14, 2014.

Perkins suffered a broken jaw in the fifth game on the season in a late November 2014 game in the NIT Season Tip-Off. Perkins pump-faked while driving to the hoop with the ball, but Georgia player Kenny Gaines jumped and kicked Perkins in the face. Perkins had to have his jaw wired shut due to the fracture and was ruled out indefinitely, with no timetable on his return. Four months later, he was still on the mend and still could not participate in any contact drills in practice.
He was finally cleared to play with full contact in late April 2015. In August 2015, he was granted a medical hardship waiver, and which allowed him to have 4 years of eligibility remaining effective at the start of the 2015–16 season.

Perkins was named to the First Team All-West Coast Conference as a redshirt junior as well as Academic All-Conference. Perkins averaged 12.3 points and 5.3 assists per game in 2017-18. He had shoulder surgery in April 2018.

Coming into his senior season, Perkins was named to the Preseason All-WCC Team. As a senior, Perkins averaged 11 points and a career-high 6.3 assists per game. He became Gonzaga's all-time assists leader.

Professional career
After going undrafted in the 2019 NBA draft, Perkins joined the Charlotte Hornets for the 2019 NBA Summer League. On August 6, 2019, Perkins signed an Exhibit 10 contract with the Hornets. He was released on October 13 during training camp. Following training camp, Perkins was added to the roster of the Hornets' NBA G League affiliate, the Greensboro Swarm.

On February 28, 2020, Perkins was traded to the Texas Legends alongside Tyler Nelson in exchange for Quincy Acy and a second-round pick in the 2020 G League draft.

On August 3, 2020, Perkins signed with GTK Gliwice of the PLK.

On January 4, 2021, Perkins signed with Partizan of the ABA League. On July 17, he signed with New Basket Brindisi of the Lega Basket Serie A (LBA). Perkins averaged 10.3 points, 5.7 assists, 3.7 rebounds, and 1.1 steals per game.

On February 7, 2022, he signed with Petkim Spor of the Basketbol Süper Ligi.

On May 15, 2022, he has signed with Brujos de Guayama of the Baloncesto Superior Nacional (BSN).

On July 24, 2022, he has signed with Hapoel Gilboa Galil of the Israeli Premier League.

On December 12, 2022, he signed with Stal Ostrów Wielkopolski of the Polish Basketball League (PLK).

On March 13, 2023, he signed with Petkim Spor of the Basketbol Süper Ligi (BSL).

Career statistics

College

|-
| style="text-align:left;"| 2014–15
| style="text-align:left;"| Gonzaga
| 5 || 0 || 20.2 || .500 || .400 || .750 || 1.0 || 3.4 || .8 || .2 || 5.0
|-
| style="text-align:left;"| 2015–16
| style="text-align:left;"| Gonzaga
| 36 || 36 || 30.8 || .433 || .378 || .700 || 3.3 || 4.1 || 1.2 || .3 || 10.1
|-
| style="text-align:left;"| 2016–17
| style="text-align:left;"| Gonzaga
| 38 || 35 || 29.1 || .418 || .399 || .729 || 2.3 || 3.1 || .9 || .2 || 8.1
|-
| style="text-align:left;"| 2017–18
| style="text-align:left;"| Gonzaga
| 37 || 37 || 32.9 || .439 || .393 || .753 || 3.1 || 5.3 || 1.2 || .1 || 12.3
|-
| style="text-align:left;"| 2018–19
| style="text-align:left;"| Gonzaga
| 37 || 37 || 31.3 || .454 || .366 || .816 || 2.7 || 6.2 || 1.5 || .1 || 11.0
|- class="sortbottom"
| style="text-align:center;" colspan="2"| Career
| 153 || 145 || 30.6 || .438 || .386 || .750 || 2.8 || 4.6 || 1.2 || .2 || 10.2

See also
 List of NCAA Division I men's basketball players with 147 games played

References

External links
Gonzaga Bulldogs bio

1995 births
Living people
American men's basketball players
American expatriate basketball people in Italy
American expatriate basketball people in Serbia
Basketball players from Denver
Gonzaga Bulldogs men's basketball players
Greensboro Swarm players
Hapoel Gilboa Galil Elyon players
KK Partizan players
New Basket Brindisi players
Petkim Spor players
Point guards